Sutton Heath and Bog is an  biological Site of Special Scientific Interest east of Wansford in Cambridgeshire.

This site has two types of grassland, both of which are rare in Cambridgeshire. They are calcareous grassland on Jurassic limestone and base-poor marshy neutral grassland. The base poor areas have a diverse variety of plant species, including some which are locally uncommon.

The site is private land but a public footpath runs through the northern end.

References

Sites of Special Scientific Interest in Cambridgeshire